Russ Dwayne Millard (born March 1, 1973 in Cedar Rapids, Iowa) is an American basketball player who was selected by the Phoenix Suns in the second round (39th pick overall) of the 1996 NBA draft. A 6'8" forward from University of Iowa,

College career
Millard was a member of the Iowa Hawkeyes for five seasons, redshirting his true freshman season. He was named third team All-Big Ten Conference as a senior after averaging 13.7 and seven rebounds per game.

Professional career
Millard was drafted by Phoenix Suns in the second round (39th pick overall) of the 1996 NBA draft, but never played in an NBA game. He signed a contract with Pallacanestro Varese to start his professional career.

References

External links 
 ESPN.com bio

1973 births
Living people
Basketball players from Florida
Iowa Hawkeyes men's basketball players
La Crosse Bobcats players
Parade High School All-Americans (boys' basketball)
Phoenix Suns draft picks
Sportspeople from Cedar Rapids, Iowa
American men's basketball players
Forwards (basketball)